Karl Agell (born August 14, 1966) is a Canadian heavy metal singer. He is best known for being the fifth recording lead vocalist of  Corrosion of Conformity from 1989 until his departure in 1993, as well as being a founding member of Leadfoot. He has also formed a project called Blind.

Early life
Agell was born on August 14, 1966, in Montreal, Quebec, to Swedish parents.

Career

Seizure 
Agell was the first vocalist for the Connecticut punk/hardcore band Seizure in the mid-1980s with John Munera (bass), Jeff Coleman (drums) and Sex Bomb (guitar) .

Corrosion of Conformity

Agell joined Corrosion of Conformity in late 1989. The band released their third album called Blind with Agell as the lead vocalist. In 1993, Agell and Phil Swisher left the band without recording the fourth album (before Swisher was replaced by original C.O.C. bassist Mike Dean), before Keenan took over on lead vocals and rhythm guitar.

Leadfoot

In 1995, Agell and Phil Swisher formed Leadfoot. In 1997, the band released their debut album, Bring It On. In 1999, Leadfoot released their second album, Take a Look. In 2003, Leadfoot released their third album entitled We Drink for Free. In 2004, Agell's long-time bandmate Phil Swisher left the band after Swisher formed two hardcore punk bands, UNICEF and Blood Bath.

Discography

Seizure

Corrosion of Conformity

Leadfoot albums

References

1966 births
Canadian expatriates in the United States
Canadian heavy metal singers
Canadian people of Swedish descent
Corrosion of Conformity members
Living people
Singers from Montreal
Musicians from Raleigh, North Carolina
20th-century Canadian male singers
21st-century Canadian male singers